Sandra Whittaker (born 29 January 1963) is a British sprinter. She competed in the women's 200 metres at the 1984 Summer Olympics.

References

External links
 

1963 births
Living people
Athletes (track and field) at the 1984 Summer Olympics
Scottish female sprinters
British female sprinters
Olympic athletes of Great Britain
Athletes (track and field) at the 1982 Commonwealth Games
Athletes (track and field) at the 1986 Commonwealth Games
Commonwealth Games bronze medallists for Scotland
Commonwealth Games medallists in athletics
Sportspeople from Bellshill
Olympic female sprinters
Medallists at the 1982 Commonwealth Games
Medallists at the 1986 Commonwealth Games